Anchietea is a genus of flowering plants in the violet family Violaceae, with six accepted species, found in tropical South America.

Description 

Lianas or reclining shrubs with oblong-lanceolate to ovate leaves. The flowers, which may be unisexual or bisexual, are in axillary racemoids or fascicles, with a white to orange corollas that are strongly zygomorphic (bilaterally symmetrical) with the long bottom petal weakly differentiated with a well exserted (projecting) spur. On the five stamens, the filaments are strongly connate (fused) with the two lowest anthers calcarate (spurred) and possessing a small dorsal connective appendage that is entire and ovate. In the gynoecium, the style is rostellate (beaked). The fruit is a very thin walled bladder-like capsule. There are many seeds per carpel, that are orbicular in outline and strongly flattened and encircled with a low interrupted ridge, or broad wing. The genus is characterized by membranaceous inflated capsules that usually prematurely expose the strongly flattened seeds to maturation.

Taxonomy 

The genus Anchietea was first described by Saint-Hilaire in 1824, with a single species Anchietea salutaris, which thus is considered the type species. Therefore the genus bears his name, A.St.-Hil., as the botanical authority. Shortly before this, Martius had described a species in a related genera, Noisettia pyrifolia. In 1831, Don transferred this species to Anchietea, noting that the specific epithet pyrifolia referred to "pear-shaped leaves". A revision of the genus in 2013 identified A. salutaris and A. pyrifolia as conspecific, and since A. pyrifolia had priority (as Noisettia pyrifolia) it is the type species.

Early taxonomic schemes, primarily based on floral morphology, such as Bentham and Hooker (1862) placed Anchietea within subfamily Violoideae, tribe Violeae, subtribe Violinae. Anchietea is one of four lianescent genera in Violaceae, together with Calyptrion Ging., Agatea A.Gray and the more recently discovered  (2003) Hybanthopsis Paula-Souza. Historically, these genera were distributed among separate subtribes, with Anchietea within subtribe Violinae with Calyptrion and Hybanthopsis and Agatea in subtribe Hybanthinae.

Molecular phylogenetic studies have now grouped these four genera together into a single lianescent clade, one of four within the family Violaceae.

Etymology 

The genus Anchietea is named for the sixteenth century Jesuit missionary and naturalist Joseph of Anchieta, who described the Brazilian flora.

Species 

 Anchietea ballardii Paula-Souza
 Anchietea exaltata Eichler
 Anchietea ferrucciae Paula-Souza & Zmarzty
 Anchietea frangulifolia (Kunth) Melch.
 Anchietea pyrifolia (Mart.) G.Don
 Anchietea sellowiana Cham. & Schltdl.

Estimates of the number of species in Anchietea has varied considerably between five and nine, but historically, the genus has been poorly described and new species have continued to be described. Paula-Souza and colleagues recognize six species, having added A. ferrucciae in 2010 as a new description and A. ballardii in 2016.

Distribution and habitat 

Extra-Amazonian South America, in the Seasonally Dry Tropical Forests (SDTF) of South America.

References

Bibliography 

Books and theses
 
 
 
 
 
 
 
 

Articles
 
 
 
 
 
 
 
 

Websites
 
 
 
 
 

Violaceae
Malpighiales genera